A deputy leadership election for the Labour Party in the United Kingdom took place on 2 October 1983 to replace incumbent Deputy Leader Denis Healey. Healey had served in the position since 1980, becoming deputy leader at the same time that Michael Foot became party leader. Foot and Healey had both announced their resignations after the general election on 9 June 1983, in which a disastrous performance left the Labour Party with just 209 seats in parliament.

The election was conducted using the Labour party's electoral college. It was won by Roy Hattersley, who won more than two-thirds of the votes. On the same day, Neil Kinnock won the leadership election. A young Peter Mandelson was employed in Hattersley's campaign team for the deputy leadership contest.

The election took place at Labour Party conference, with affiliated trade unions holding 40% of the votes, delegates from Constituency Labour Parties holding 30% of the votes, and the Parliamentary Labour Party holding the final 30% of the votes.

Candidates
 Denzil Davies, Shadow Secretary of State for Wales, Member of Parliament for Llanelli
 Gwyneth Dunwoody, Shadow Secretary of State for Health, Member of Parliament for Crewe and Nantwich
 Roy Hattersley, Shadow Home Secretary, Member of Parliament for Birmingham Sparkbrook
 Michael Meacher, former Under-Secretary of State for Trade, Member of Parliament for Oldham West

Result

See also
 1983 Labour Party leadership election (UK)

References

Sources
 Butler, David & Butler, Gareth (2006). British political facts since 1979 (p. 55). Basingstoke: Palgrave Macmillan. 
 http://privatewww.essex.ac.uk/~tquinn/labour_party_deputy.htm 

1983
1983 elections in the United Kingdom
Labour Party deputy leadership election